Pompeja is a monotypic moth genus in the family Lasiocampidae erected by Gottlieb August Wilhelm Herrich-Schäffer in 1856. Its only species, Pompeja psorica, described by the same author two years earlier, is found in Brazil.

References

Lasiocampidae
Monotypic moth genera